Varvara Sergeyevna Myasnikova (– April 22, 1978) was a Soviet actress.

Life 
Myasnikova was born in Saint Petersburg in 1900, the daughter of an insurance agent and a housewife. She had a sister and brother. She started working at Narkompros in 1918, where she also started in a theater group, then joining an experimental theater company within Narkompros. In 1925, the group ended up due of lack of funding, but the actors were hired by the Tovstonogov Bolshoi Drama Theater.

Her film career began in silent cinema in 1928, with the film The Parisian Cobbler (Парижский сапожник). In 1931, she was hired by the state-funded film production unit Lenfilm. In 1929, she acted in Fragment of an Empire (Обломок империи). In 1934, she married Sergei Vasilyev, film director, editor and screenwriter, who was also the screenwriter and director of Chapayev (Чапаев), that year, in which Myasnikova played Anka, a machine gun operator; her role would inspire girls from the Soviet Union to volunteer in the Red Army, like Nina Onilova.

The couple had a daughter, named Varvara after her mother. In the same year, she was awarded the title of Emeritus Artist of the Soviet Union for her role in Chapayev, at the Moscow International Film Festival.

With the outbreak of World War II, the Lenfilm team was evacuated to Almaty, Kazakhstan. Myasnikova, her daughter and husband left Leningrad. Her mother and brother, Alekei, died in the Nazi siege of the city in 1942.

In 1947, Myasnikova played the Fairy Godmother in the feature Cinderella (Золушка), by Nadezhda Kocheverova and Mikhail Chapiro, but her participation is very limited in the production. Her marriage to Sergei Vasilyev ended in divorce in 1955 and Myasnikova moved to Moscow with her daughter. There she was hired by Mosfilm and started working in the national theater. In 1959, she played in Vladimir Kaplunovski's The Captain's Daughter and in the adaptation of Ivan Turgenev's novel, Mumu, by Yevgeny Teterin (1959).

Death 
Myasnikova died in Moscow on April 25, 1978, at the age of 74; her body was buried in the Serafimovskoe Cemetery in St. Petersburg, next to her mother and brother.

Filmography 

 The Parisian Cobbler  (Парижский сапожник) (1928)
 Fragment of an Empire (Обломок империи) (1929)
 Chapayev (Чапаев) (1934)
 The Defense of Tsaritsyn (Оборона Царицына) (1942)
 Cinderella (Золушка) (1947)
 The Captain's Daughter (Капитанская дочка) (1958)
 Mumu (Муму) (1959)

References

External links 

 

1900 births
1978 deaths
Actresses from Saint Petersburg
People from Sankt-Peterburgsky Uyezd
Soviet film actresses
Soviet stage actresses